Sixth Sense is the fourth studio album released by the South Korean girl group Brown Eyed Girls. The album was released on 23 September 2011. The song with the same title was used as the promotional song. The song "Hot Shot" was released on September 16 as a teaser for the album. A repackaged version of the album was released on November 4. The repackaged album comes with a DVD, a 40-pages photobook, a calendar with 12 pages, 4 autographed cards by the girls and a poster.

Concept
The concept for the album is “Resistance for freedom of expression through music via sixth sense.” Representatives of NegaNetwork explained, “This album focuses not only on their singing and performance. The members hope to convey their thoughts to the public through music. Their title track is an expression of the limitations of experiencing music with only five senses, and it asks people to feel it instead with their sixth sense. The song itself is very free in style.”

Promotions
The promotions of the album and song "Sixth Sense" started in September 24, on MBC's Show! Music Core and was also promoted on the shows M! Countdown, Inkigayo and Music Bank. The song "Hot Shot" was promoted during the comeback week. The song won four music show awards: two mutizens on Inkigayo and two awards on M! Countdown. The promotions of the song ended in October 23. Promotions for the song "Cleansing Cream" started in November 4, on Music Bank.

Track listing

Chart performance

Album chart

Sixth Sense

Repackage

Single chart 

The title track "Sixth Sense" debuted atop the spot of the Gaon Single Chart with 511,798 downloads in its first week of release. By the end of 2011 the song was downloaded 2,585,879 times and it earned the position #29 in the Gaon Year-end Chart, but  the song continued to achieve downloads in 2012, in fact by the end of July it was reported that the song has accumulated 3,991,637 downloads.

Other songs charted

Sales and certifications

Release history

References

External links 
 
 
 

2011 albums
Korean-language albums
Brown Eyed Girls albums